Unemployment has been a serious social issue in China in recent years, in regards to both an increase in quantity and its unequal impact on different social regions. The influence of foreign investment in China has greatly increased since the Open Door Policy was implemented in the early 1980s. The relationship between foreign-funded enterprises and urban labor market development is dual. Opponents influence the shape of labor-market regulation; however, foreign-funded enterprises have also become a major source of demand for urban and rural areas migrant workers. The exploitation of China's labor force by foreign-owned enterprises leads to the shortage of domestic enterprises’ labor force. Demographic factors also affect unemployment in China, such as age and sex. The position of women in the labor market has been deteriorating, with a decline in labor force participation rate, rising unemployment, increased work intensity and a widening gender pay gap.

Rural labor migration and urban unemployment 

The unemployment rates of every country throughout the world are strongly correlated with gross domestic product and rural and urban labor. Official government statistics show that unemployment in China is unusually low relative to gross domestic product and suspiciously stable. China's labor market was highly regulated and dominated by state-owned enterprises, with an average unemployment rate of 3.7 per cent between 1988 and 1995, but this rose sharply after numerous lay-offs between 1995 and 2002, reaching an average unemployment rate of 9.5 per cent between 2002 and 2009. These changes had the greatest impact on non-technical workers from rural area, particularly less educated women and younger workers. Lastly, estimates of unemployment and labor force participation rates were provided for all urban residents, including migrants without a registered permanent residence. As of 2018, the total number of registered migrant workers stands at around 288.4 million. 

In 2002, economists Fan Zhai and Zhi Wang simulated China's economy following its accession to the World Trade Organization. The study concluded that there was a need for coordination between China's rural-urban migration policy, labor market reform, and trade liberalization measures. This action would not only prevent a deterioration in urban unemployment, but also increase the flexibility of the labor market to create more employment opportunities for rural unskilled labor workers from the agricultural sector.

Impact of the global financial crisis on unemployment 

Many migrant workers returned to their homes following the Global Financial Crisis (GFC). The GFC resulted in reduced consumer demand in developed countries while export orders for Chinese goods declined. During the financial crisis, prices fell sharply, businesses and consumers were unable to repay their debts, and financial institutions ran short of liquidity. Migrant workers, who were already socially and legally marginalized from the precarious nature of their employment, experienced increased poverty. At the beginning of 2009, the number of unemployed immigrants exceeded 20 million, accounting for about 40% of the total population who lost their jobs. In the months following August 2008, China's export orders declined sharply, especially in coast cities. Most businesses within the Pearl River Delta Economic Zone closed. This resulted in poor job opportunities for college graduates, which further decreased labor force participation rates. However, the government provided assistance to the unemployed and was responsible for stabilizing the unemployment situation of urban registered permanent residents to increase employment opportunities.

State capacity and governance issues to address unemployment
Despite the high level of economic growth, the restructuring of China's economy has resulted in an increase in urban unemployment over the past decade, resulting in civil unrest in many cities. Since 1986, and especially since 1997, the central government's policy on unemployment has focused on helping cities and towns register the unemployed and “laid-off workers” through unemployment insurance, reemployment service centers and employment services such as training and employment assistance. These efforts are aimed at controlling layoffs and job creation in state-owned enterprises by stimulating economic growth.

At the same time, the Chinese government has been committed to promoting employment and industrial structure through boosting the national economy, adjusting the economic structure, advancing the reform of the political and economic system, balancing urban and rural economic development, and continuously increasing the social security system. The government has also used monetary policy, taxation and fiscal policy to reduce unemployment. The goal of such policy was to incentivize self-employment, the creation of new businesses, and medium/small enterprises (SMEs) hiring more workers. The government provided small loans and interest subsidies to support SME development for the sake of expanding employment.

Lastly, the government actively cultivates and develops the labor market. From the late 1990s onward, the Chinese government has attempted to build a scientific, standardized, and modernized labor market, and constructed a public employment service system. “All levels of [the] public employment service would provide free job placement and employment guidance to the urban unemployed and rural migrant workers. Providing a “one-stop” service ranging from registration of laid-off and unemployed population looking for jobs, job placement, social insurance coverage, and vocational skill training”.

Youth unemployment 
The youth unemployment rate in China is worth noting due to young workers representing a significant proportion of China's workforce. During 2004 to 2009, it was easy for a low-skilled young workers to find jobs; however, due to economic stagnation, young workers today may face increasing difficulties in seeking or maintaining jobs. Jobs accessible to young workers tend to be precarious, with low wages and lacking social security benefits such as unemployment welfare and insurance. At the same time, many graduates cannot compete for jobs with top university graduates, they are not willing to take low-quality, low-paid jobs. Business professors Terence Tse and Mark Esposito (2014) consider some of these young people to be NEETs. Tse and Esposito suggest that some parents encourage their children remain unemployed and find better jobs, rather than accept the low-quality jobs that the parents already have.

Youth unemployment can also be attributed to structural unemployment, which occurs when there is a mismatch between the skills that jobs require and the skills that workers possess. According to research by Zhao and Huang (2010), there were 750,000 college graduates who could not find a job in 2003 after graduating in 1999, which increased to 1.2 million in 2005, and nearly 2 million in 2009 (approximately 32% of the total 6.1 million graduates that year). The real numbers might be higher than official data due to the minimum standard of a 70% employment rate and possibly fraudulent reporting by the Ministry of Education. Job search success for college graduates often depends on the reputation of the university. For example, students who graduate from prestigious universities in China can often easily find high salary jobs, in contrast to graduates from less prestigious universities. This may be reflective of academic disparity, where academic conditions such as faculty and environment of top universities are better than those of unknown universities. The difficulty and competitiveness of university admission also exacerbate the problem by limiting education for high school graduates.

References 

Employment in China
China